Timergara is a city and also the district headquarters of Lower Dir District in Pakistan. Timergara City is located on the east bank of the Panjkora River. The town is the site of excavated graves of Indo-Aryans, dating from 1500 to 600 BC. On the west side of the Panjkora River is the excavated site of Balambat. The site has been occupied continuously since the time of the Indo-Aryans in 1500 BC. Discoveries included houses dating from 500 BC and fire altars, showing that the people followed early form Aryan religion which revolved around fire worshipping. The areas early political history is defined by the control of the Bactrians, Scythians and Hepthalites, and artifacts and ruins from these periods are found throughout the region. At the 1998 Census, the town had a population of 43,774. Most of the main city lies on the bank of the river Panjkora, which separates Balambat from the main city.

Public Universities in Timergara Dir Lower 
 University of Dir
 Virtual University of Pakistan Timergara Campus
 Timergara Medical College (Rani) pending from 2015
 Government College of Technology Kandaro Balambat Timergara
Government Post Graduate college Timergara
Government Girls Post Graduate college Timergara
Government Girls Post Graduate college Balambat
Abdul Wali Khan university Mardan Timergara Campus

Education demographics in Lower Dir 
The total gross enrollment ratio is 73.83% excluding Kachi and 79.59% including Kachi class. Student–teacher ratio is 43 students per teacher. There are 41 boys per male teacher and 46 girls per female teacher.

According to the recent Universal Primary Education (UPE) survey, the total number of children in the age group 5–7 years is 104,498 in which 56,937  are boys and 47,561 are girls. Due to the limited access, the number of out-of-school children among the age group 5–7 years is 25,169. Almost 24% children of the total (age group 5–7 years) are out of school, in which 19% are boys and 30% are girls. These figures also include the dropout students of both genders.

Economy 
The area has a weak agriculture infrastructure with no industry. The economy is completely based on the remittances sent back to the area by people (mainly males) living in the Middle East.

People 
The people of Timergara are mainly Pashtun. The main tribes are Yousafzai, Ibrahimkhel, Utmankhel and Umarkhel. Tor Baba (Abdur Rahim Khan), Timergara Babaje and Jaloo Baba were the prominent religious figures of this area. Author Suleman Shahid discussed it very briefly in his recent book Ghumnam Riasat. Abdur Rahim Khan migrated from Mandal (Bajawar Agency) in the late seventeenth century and settled in Timergara. He was known as Tor Baba for his piousness. Abdur Rahim Khan and Akhund Ilyas (d. 1676) were disciples of Shaikh Adam Binori. The Mandal (clan of Utmankheil) in Timergara or mostly called Shaikhan are the descendants of Baba Abdur Rahim Khan.

Climate 
The summer season is hot and arid while the winter is cold and wet. A steep rise in temperature occurs from May to June, and then is very hot from July to the end of August, but during September the weather becomes cooler, especially at night. A rapid fall of temperature occurs from October onwards. The coldest months are December and January. The mean minimum temperature recorded for the month of January is −8 °C.

Rainfall mostly occurs in the months of July, August, December, January and February. Towards the end of cold weather, there are occasional thunderstorms and hailstorms. Timergara is equally affected by global warming and climatic changes. In 2010, along with snowfall, heavy floods occurred which resulted in heavy damage to the infrastructure of the city. In March 2014, the Panjkora river's level began rising again, which was a threat to the Balambat bridge.

Food 
Popular foods are fish and beef cooked as chapli kabab, seekh kabab, and tikka. A tandoor (oven) for baking bread is present in many houses. Many inhabitants eat lobya (beans), saag and juwar doday (bread of maize). Lassi and saag with sookrak (sweet bread of maize) are also offered to guests.

Dress and ornaments 
The people generally wear typical Pashtun dress. During the winter season, men wear a chadar (a long piece of cloth, mostly used to make the body warm) around the body along with kameez (shirt) and shalwar. Women typically wear shalwar kameez and burqa. A Chitrali woolen cap is used in winter, while a typical light Dirojee cap is worn in the summer. Sapley (leather sandals) are the most common footwear among men.

Festivals and fairs 
Festivals and fairs are a part of the Pashtun culture. The most important festivals are the two Eids (Eid al-Adha and Eid al-Fitr). Apart from that, most youngsters hike in the hills of Kumrat, Lowari Pass, Laram, Shahi and Oshery in pleasant weather.

Population size and growth 
When Timergara was declared as the district headquarters of Dir, migration of the people to the city increased. The population of Timergara has increased about threefold since 1990.

Transport 
Timergara connects Bajawar, Dir Upper and Chitral to the rest of Khyber Pukhtunkhwa. Timergara has two busy bypass roads that connect different areas. The nearest airport is Peshawar International Airport, about ninety-eight miles away. The buses, taxis and private vehicles are the main means of transport.

Sports 
There is not public sports ground but the people of khungi payeen village make for herself a very beautiful ground in bank of river. Football player play their football and cricketers play and also players volleyball.
There is no proper facility available for players to play professional sports. The area has produced some prominent players in different sports i.e. Naseem Shah,Imran Khan and Israrullah (cricket), Murtaza Ahmad (hockey) and Irfan Ahmad (badminton). These players have represented Pakistan in different types of international cricket and provincial and regional teams in different games. The youngsters have a great passion for sports like cricket, football, basketball, volleyball, and hockey. Rest House Ground and FC Ground (Balambat) are the two main sporting events sites. The residents have made small grounds for sports facilities on the banks of rivers and as well as at the bottom of mountains.

Health facilities 
The main healthcare facility is District Headquarters Hospital Timergara. There are many more private hospitals and a number of hospitals available for ladies' treatment. MSF (Médecins Sans Frontières), an international NGO, is supporting parts of the District Headquarters Hospital e.g. Maternity, Accident, Emergency and Newborn Unit.

The pioneer practitioner of this area was the late Dr. Burhan Uddin (1942–2009). He provided primary health care to the people of this area when no hospital existed.

See also 

 Dara Utmankhel
 Baroon
 Chakdara
 Maidan
 Malak Abad, Balambat
 Malakand Valley

References 

Lower Dir District
2
Cities in Khyber Pakhtunkhwa